Kepong may refer to:
Kepong
Bukit Kepong, town in Johor, Malaysia
Kepong (federal constituency), represented in the Dewan Rakyat
Kepong (state constituency), formerly represented in the Selangor State Legislative Assembly (1959–74)